Marios Papaefthymiou is the Ted and Janice Smith Family Foundation dean of the Donald Bren School of Information and Computer Sciences at the University of California, Irvine. He previously served as chair of computer science and engineering at the University of Michigan, Ann Arbor, MI. He was named Fellow of the Institute of Electrical and Electronics Engineers (IEEE) in 2014 for contributions to the design of adiabatic circuits for high-performance computing.

References 

Fellow Members of the IEEE
Living people
University of Michigan faculty
Year of birth missing (living people)
American electrical engineers